Enghien-les-Bains is a commune in the department of Val-d'Oise, France. It is located in the northern suburbs of Paris,  from the centre of Paris.

Enghien-les-Bains is famous as a spa resort and a well-to-do suburb of Paris, developed in the nineteenth century around the scenic lake of Enghien. A casino, the only one in the vicinity of Paris, is located on the shores of the lake.

Name
The suffix les Bains (literally "the Baths") was added to the name when the commune was incorporated in 1850, to distinguish this place from the Belgian city of Enghien, near Mons, and to acknowledge the thermal baths for which Enghien-les-Bains is famous.

The name Enghien itself does refer to the Belgian city, which was a fief of the princes of Condé, a cadet branch of the French royal family, who inherited the duchy of Montmorency in 1633. In 1689 they were allowed by King Louis XIV to rename the duchy of Montmorency to be the "duchy of Enghien", in order to revive the title, duc d'Enghien, which they had lost in 1569 at the death of Louis I de Bourbon, prince de Condé, who had not legally registered the title.

The village of Montmorency (now a city) continued to be known as "Montmorency", despite the official name change, but the name "Enghien" clung to the nearby lake and marshland that would later become the commune of Enghien-les-Bains.

History
Before the French Revolution, what is now Enghien-les-Bains was a lake and a marshland under the jurisdiction of Montmorency.

In 1766, a priest at the oratory of Montmorency discovered a warm  sulphur spring near the lake of Enghien, and the area began to develop as a spa resort.

At the creation of the communes in 1790, during the French Revolution, the area of Enghien was withdrawn from the jurisdiction of Montmorency and divided between several communes.

In the nineteenth century, the development of Enghien led to its incorporation as a commune. The commune, which was named Enghien-les-Bains, was created on 7 August 1850 by detaching a part of the territory of Deuil-la-Barre and merging it with a part of the territory of Saint-Gratien, a part of the territory of Soisy-sous-Montmorency, and a part of the territory of Épinay-sur-Seine.

Population

Transport
Enghien-les-Bains is served by two stations on the Transilien Paris-Nord suburban rail line: La Barre–Ormesson and Enghien-les-Bains.

Education
Primary schools include:
 Les Cygnes
 Raoul Riet

Casino

Known as the biggest place to gamble near Paris, Enghien les Bains casino, which opened in 1901 was recently renovated to provide luxury and comfort to all tourists traveling to the capital of France.

The resort has two hotels and offers to the guests the opportunity to dine in one of its many restaurants. You will also find bars and a theater where concerts and shows are organized. 
 
On the first floor of the casino, you will find nearly 40 table games featuring Blackjack, Punto Banco in addition to French and English Roulette.

Twin towns — sister cities
Enghien-les-Bains is twinned with:

  Enghien, Belgium (1957)
  Bad Dürrheim, Germany (1992)

Notable people 
 Cyril Akpomedah (b. *1979), basketball player
 Marcel Bleustein-Blanchet (1906–1996), member of the Free French resistance and founder of the Publicis advertising empire 
 Aurelien Collin (b. 1986), Football player for New York Red Bulls of Major League Soccer
 Johanna Joseph (b. 1992), basketball player
 Alphonse Laurencic (1902–1939), Republican activist and trade unionist in Spain
 Laurine Lecavelier (b. 1996), figure skater
 Philippe Méaille (b. 1973), Contemporary Art collector
 Denis Ménochet (b. 1976), actor
 Mistinguett (1875-1956), actress and singer
 Nathaniel Virayie (b. 1961), professional footballer

See also
Communes of the Val-d'Oise department

References

External links

 Enghien-les-Bains official website 
 Association of Mayors of the Val d'Oise 
 Photo gallery of Enghien and its lake on photoenligne 

Communes of Val-d'Oise
Spa towns in France
Tourist attractions in Val-d'Oise
Val-d'Oise communes articles needing translation from French Wikipedia